Friedrich A. Kittler (June 12, 1943 – October 18, 2011) was a literary scholar and a media theorist. His works relate to media, technology, and the military.

Biography
Friedrich Adolf Kittler was born in 1943 in Rochlitz in Saxony. His family fled with him to West Germany in 1958, where from 1958 to 1963 he went to a natural sciences and modern languages Gymnasium in Lahr in the Black Forest, and thereafter, until 1972, he studied German studies, Romance philology and philosophy at the Albert Ludwigs University of Freiburg in Freiburg im Breisgau.

In 1976, Kittler received his doctorate in philosophy after a thesis on the poet Conrad Ferdinand Meyer. Between 1976 and 1986 he worked as academic assistant at the university's Deutsches Seminar. In 1984, he earned his Habilitation in the field of Modern German Literary History. He had several stints as a visiting assistant professor or visiting professor at universities in the United States, such as the University of California, Berkeley, the University of California, Santa Barbara, Stanford University, and the European Graduate School.

From 1986 to 1990, he headed the DFG's Literature and Media Analysis project in Kassel and in 1987 he was appointed Professor of Modern German Studies at the Ruhr University. In 1993 he was appointed to the chair for Media Aesthetics and History at the Humboldt University of Berlin.

In 1993, Kittler was awarded the "Siemens Media Arts Prize" (Siemens-Medienkunstpreis) by ZKM Karlsruhe (Zentrum für Kunst und Medientechnologie, or "Centre for Art and Media Technology") for his research in the field of media theory.

He was recognized in 1996 as a distinguished scholar at Yale University and in 1997 as a distinguished visiting professor at Columbia University in New York. Kittler was a member of the Hermann von Helmholtz Centre for Culture and the research group Bild Schrift Zahl ("Picture Writing Number") (DFG).

Among Kittler's theses was his tendency to argue, with a mixture of polemicism, apocalypticism, erudition, and humor, that technological conditions were closely bound up with epistemology and ontology itself. This claim and his style of argumention is aptly summed up in his dictum "Nur was schaltbar ist, ist überhaupt"—a phrase that could be translated as "Only that which is switchable, exists" or more freely, "Only that which can be switched, can be." This phrase plays both on the concept that in principle any representation can be presented according to the on/off binary logic of computing. Kittler goes one step further by suggesting that, conversely, anything that can't be "switched" can't really "be," at least under current technical conditions. He invoked this doctrine on his deathbed in 2011. Dying in a hospital in Berlin and sustained only by medical instruments, his final words were "Alle Apparate ausschalten", which translates as "switch off all apparatuses".

Work
Friedrich Kittler is influential in the new approach to media theory that grew popular starting in the 1980s, new media (which translates roughly to "technical media"). Kittler's central project is to "prove to the human sciences [...] their technological-media a priori" (Hartmut Winkler), or in his own words: "Driving the human out of the humanities", a title that he gave a work that he published in 1980.

Kittler sees an autonomy in technology and therefore disagrees with Marshall McLuhan's reading of the media as "extensions of man": "Media are not pseudopods for extending the human body. They follow the logic of escalation that leaves us and written history behind it." 

Consequently, he sees in writing literature, in writing programmes and in burning structures into silicon chips a complete continuum: "As we know and simply do not say, no human being writes anymore. [...] Today, human writing runs through inscriptions burnt into silicon by electronic lithography [...]. The last historic act of writing may thus have been in the late seventies when a team of Intel engineers [plotted] the hardware architecture of their first integrated microprocessor." (Kittler, Es gibt keine Software. In: ders.: Draculas Vermächtnis. Technische Schriften.)

Publications
 1977: Der Traum und die Rede. Eine Analyse der Kommunikationssituation Conrad Ferdinand Meyers. Bern-Munich
 1979: Dichtung als Sozialisationsspiel. Studien zu Goethe und Gottfried Keller (with Gerhard Kaiser). Göttingen
 1985: Aufschreibesysteme 1800/1900. Fink: Munich.  (English edition: Discourse Networks 1800 / 1900, with a foreword by David E. Wellbery. Stanford 1990)
 1986: Grammophon Film Typewriter. Berlin: Brinkmann & Bose.  (English edition: Gramophone, Film, Typewriter, Stanford 1999)
 1990: Die Nacht der Substanz. Bern
 1991: Dichter – Mutter – Kind. Munich
 1993: Draculas Vermächtnis: Technische Schriften. Leipzig: Reclam.  Essays zu den "Effekten der Sprengung des Schriftmonopols", zu den Analogmedien Schallplatte, Film und Radio sowie "technische Schriften, die numerisch oder algebraisch verfasst sind".
 1997: Literature, Media, Information Systems: Essays (published by  John Johnston). Amsterdam
 1998: Hardware das unbekannte Wesen
 1998: Zur Theoriegeschichte von Information Warfare
 1999: Hebbels Einbildungskraft – die dunkle Natur. Frankfurt, New York, Vienna
 2000: Eine Kulturgeschichte der Kulturwissenschaft. München
 2000: Nietzsche – Politik des Eigennamens: wie man abschafft, wovon man spricht (with Jacques Derrida). Berlin.
 2001: Vom Griechenland (with Cornelia Vismann; Internationaler Merve Diskurs Bd.240). Merve: Berlin. 
 2002: Optische Medien. Merve: Berlin.  (English edition: Optical Media, with an introduction by John Durham Peters. Polity Press 2010)
 2002: Zwischen Rauschen und Offenbarung. Zur Kultur- und Mediengeschichte der Stimme (as publisher). Akademie Verlag, Berlin
 2004: Unsterbliche. Nachrufe, Erinnerungen, Geistergespräche. Wilhelm Fink Verlag, Paderborn.
 2006: Musik und Mathematik. Band 1: Hellas, Teil 1: Aphrodite. Wilhelm Fink Verlag, Paderborn.
 2009: Musik und Mathematik. Band 1: Hellas, Teil 2: Eros. Wilhelm Fink Verlag, Paderborn.
 2011: Das Nahen der Götter vorbereiten. Wilhelm Fink, Paderborn.
 2013: Die Wahrheit der technischen Welt. Essays zur Genealogie der Gegenwart, Suhrkamp, Berlin. (English edition: The truth of the technological world: essays on the genealogy of presence, translated by Erik Butler, with an afterword by Hans Ulrich Gumbrecht. Stanford 2013.)
 2013: Philosophien der Literatur. Merve, Berlin.
 2013: Die Flaschenpost an die Zukunft. With Till Nikolaus von Heiseler, Kulturverlag Kadmos, Berlin.

Lectures 
 Farben und/oder Maschinen denken
 Ontologie der Medien

See also
 Media influence
 Paul Virilio

Notes

Further reading
Secondary literature on Friedrich Kittler
 Frank Hartmann: Friedrich Kittler. In: Information Philosophie 25 (1997) 4, S. 40–44.
 Josef Wallmannsverger: Friedrich Kittler. In: Helmut Schanze (publisher): Metzler Lexikon Medientheorie/ Medienwissenschaft, S. 162 f. Stuttgart 2002.
 Geoffrey Winthrop-Young: Friedrich Kittler zur Einführung, Hamburg: Junius Verlag 2005.
 Geoffrey Winthrop-Young: Kittler and the Media. Cambridge, UK: Polity Press, 2011.

External links
 
 Friedrich Kittler Bibliography complete Bibliography
 Auf dem Weg in den Maschinenpark  – Rezension Friedrich Kittler: Eine Kulturgeschichte der Kulturwissenschaft – von Frank Hartmann, 28 November 2000
 Telepolis: Friedrich Kittler meets Stephan Schambach  von Stefan Krempl, 26. Mai 2000
 Telepolis: Vom Sündenfall der Software  – Medientheorie mit Entlarvungsgestus: Friedrich Kittler – von Frank Hartmann, 22 December 1998
 Telepolis: Nicht Cyborg, sondern Affe 17 April 2005
 "Rock me, Aphrodite!" – Interview mit Kittler auf Telepolis, 24 May 2006.
 "Hegel is dead. Miscellanea on Friedrich A. Kittler (1943-2011)" – Obituary on Kittler, Telepolis, 17 November 2011.
 The Sigmund H. Danziger, Jr. Memorial Lecture in the Humanities (Sigmund H. Danziger, Jr Lecture 1993-1994
 "We only have ourselves to draw upon"" – An interview by Andreas Rosenfelder
 Friedrich Kittler at Monoskop.org, extensive bibliography and reference collection

1943 births
2011 deaths
People from Rochlitz
Academic staff of European Graduate School
New media
Mass media theorists
Poststructuralists
Philosophers of technology